The Men's 50 metre butterfly swimming events for the 2020 Summer Paralympics took place at the Tokyo Aquatics Centre from August 27 to September 3, 2021. A total of three events were contested over this distance.

Schedule

Medal summary
The following is a summary of the medals awarded across all 50 metre butterfly events.

Results
The following were the results of the finals only of each of the Men's 50 metre butterfly events in each of the classifications. Further details of each event, including where appropriate heats and semi finals results, are available on that event's dedicated page.

S5

The S5 category is for swimmers who have hemiplegia, paraplegia or short stature.

The final in this classification took place on 27 August 2021:

S6

The S6 category is for swimmers who have short stature, arm amputations, or some form of coordination problem on one side of their body.

The final in this classification took place on 30 August 2021:

S7

The S7 category is for swimmers who have one leg and one arm amputation on opposite side or paralysis on one side of their body. These swimmers have full control of their arms and trunk but variable function in their legs.

The final in this classification took place on 3 September 2021:

References

Swimming at the 2020 Summer Paralympics